Big Spring, Texas was home to several minor league baseball teams between 1928 and 1955. The Hamlin Pied Pipers moved from Hamlin, Texas to Big Spring during the 1928 season and became the Big Spring Springers, who finished 6th in the West Texas League that season, 21 games out of first place under manager Armistead "Army" Magness.

The team changed its name to the Big Spring Cowboys the following year and were at one point during the season managed by Nick Carter. They dissolved following the season.

In 1938, the Big Spring Barons joined the West Texas–New Mexico League, before they moved to Odessa, Texas during the 1940 season and became the Odessa Oilers. They were replaced the following season by the Big Spring Bombers, an affiliate of the Brooklyn Dodgers, but that team only lasted one season.

The Wichita Falls Spudders moved to town in 1942 and took on the name of the Big Spring Pirates but only lasted for part of the month of June and only played road games till the league shut them down on June 20.

In 1947, the Big Spring Broncs started playing in the Longhorn League. They were the most successful team from Big Spring as they won the championship in 1949. They became the Big Spring Cosden Cops in 1955, named after the 1929 eviction of Native Americans from oil land purchased by James Cosden.

References
Baseball Reference

Defunct minor league baseball teams
Brooklyn Dodgers minor league affiliates
Washington Senators minor league affiliates
New York Yankees minor league affiliates
1928 establishments in Texas
1955 disestablishments in Texas
Defunct baseball teams in Texas
Baseball teams disestablished in 1955
Baseball teams established in 1928